The Men's BMX 24" wheel event at the 2010 South American Games was held on March 19. The qualifications started at 9:05, the semifinals at 10:05 and the Final at 10:40.

Medalists

Results

Qualification

Heat 1

Heat 2

Heat 3

Heat 4

Semifinals

Heat 1

Heat 2

Final

References
Qualification
Semifinals
Final

Cycling at the 2010 South American Games
2010 in BMX